Ingrīda is a Latvian feminine given name, a cognate of the name Ingrid, and may refer to:
Ingrīda Amantova (born 1960), Latvian luger 
Ingrīda Andriņa (1944–2015), Latvian actress
Ingrīda Circene (born 1956), Latvian politician
Ingrīda Kadaka (born 1967), Latvian artist, book designer and illustrator
Ingrīda Priedīte (born 1954), Latvian chess Grandmaster
Ingrīda Ūdre (born 1958), Latvian politician 
Ingrīda Verbele (born 1948), Latvian sprinter

References 

Latvian feminine given names
Feminine given names